Streptomyces hydrogenans is a species of bacteria from the genus Streptomyces.

See also 
 List of Streptomyces species

References 

hydrogenans
Bacteria described in 1958